Freemarket or  Vrijmarkt  is a 1997 Dutch drama film directed by Hans Hylkema.

Cast
Anneke Blok 		
Bert Geurkink 		
Sylvia Holstijn		
Onno Hooimeyer 		
Stephanie van der Schley		
Mohamed Shirwa 		
Jaap Spijkers 		
Jack Wouterse

External links 
 

1997 films
1990s Dutch-language films
1997 drama films
Dutch drama films